Elvire is a given name. Notable people with the name include:

Elvire de Brissac (born 1939), French novelist and biographer
Elvire Gertosio (born 1948), French gymnast
Elvire Murail (born 1958), French author and screenwriter
Elvire Teza (born 1981), French gymnast

See also
Elvira